Morocco competed at the 2000 Summer Olympics in Sydney, Australia.

Medalists

Athletics

Men
Track and road events

Field events

Women
Track and road events

Boxing

Men

Canoeing

Slalom

Football

Men's tournament

Team roster
Head coach: Said El-Khider

Stand-by players

Group play

Judo

Men

Sailing

Men

Swimming

Taekwondo 

Men

Women

Tennis

Men

References 
 Wallechinsky, David (2004). The Complete Book of the Summer Olympics (Athens 2004 Edition). Toronto, Canada. . 
 International Olympic Committee (2001). The Results. Retrieved 12 November 2005.
 Sydney Organising Committee for the Olympic Games (2001). Official Report of the XXVII Olympiad Volume 1: Preparing for the Games. Retrieved 20 November 2005.
 Sydney Organising Committee for the Olympic Games (2001). Official Report of the XXVII Olympiad Volume 2: Celebrating the Games. Retrieved 20 November 2005.
 Sydney Organising Committee for the Olympic Games (2001). The Results. Retrieved 20 November 2005.
 International Olympic Committee Web Site

Nations at the 2000 Summer Olympics
2000 Summer Olympics
Summer Olympics